Gustavo Antonio de Conti (born February 27, 1980), also known as Gustavinho, is a Brazilian former basketball player and currently Head coach of the NBB team Flamengo and Brazil's national team

Coaching career

Clubs
In 2018, De Conti became the head coach of the NBB basketball club Flamengo.

National teams
De Conti has also worked as an assistant coach of the senior Brazilian national basketball team. He first became an assistant with Brazil in 2012.

References

External links
New Basket Brazil Coach Profile 

1980 births
Living people
Brazilian basketball coaches
Brazilian men's basketball players
Club Athletico Paulistano basketball coaches
Flamengo basketball coaches
Point guards
Basketball players from São Paulo